Augustine Aniebo (born March 23, 1950) is a retired Nigerian general who served as military administrator of Borno State, Nigeria, during the regime of General Sani Abacha and administrator of Kogi State from August 1998 to 29 May 1999 during the transitional regime of General Abdulsalami Abubakar, handing over to the elected civilian governor Abubakar Audu on May 29, 1999, at the start of the Nigerian Fourth Republic.

Borno State Administrator
In May 1997, Nigerian security agents, working with Islamic leaders stormed a Christian church in Maiduguri, Borno State and ejected the pastor and church members. The church leaders appealed to Aniebo to act quickly to avoid a religious crisis.
In 1998, he said that the Borno State task force against smuggling had been strengthened to reduce cross-border smuggling of petroleum products to neighboring countries.

Kogi State Administrator
Appointed administrator of Kogi State in August 1998, Aniebo left office on 29 May 1999 without swearing in his successor, handing over by proxy.

References

1950 births
Living people
Igbo people
Nigerian Roman Catholics
Governors of Borno State
Governors of Kogi State
People from Anambra State
Nigerian Army officers
People from Umunze